The following are cities and towns in Somaliland, listed alphabetically. Somaliland is currently disputed with Somalia and city statuses may be disputed.

Cities and towns in Somaliland

See also 
List of cities in Somalia by population
History of Somaliland
List of cities in East Africa

Somaliland
Cities in Somaliland
Somaliland
Cities